Jessica Amy Barden (born 21 July 1992) is an English actress. She began her career as a child actress. She is best known for her role as Alyssa in the Channel 4 comedy-drama The End of the F***ing World (2017–2019). She received a British Independent Film Award nomination for her performance in Scarborough (2018). Her other films include Hanna (2011), The Lobster (2015), The New Romantic (2018), and Pink Skies Ahead (2020).

Early life
Barden was born on 21 July 1992 in Northallerton, North Yorkshire. She comes from a working-class background. Her father is a prison officer, and her mother is an accountant; she has two brothers. When she was three, the family moved to Wetherby, West Yorkshire. Barden attended Wetherby High School. She discovered acting through school and her father's love of film. She began taking classes at a local drama club and working as a television extra. She left school at 15.

Career
Barden made her acting debut in 1999 with a small role in an episode of the CITV series My Parents Are Aliens. She later appeared in episodes of the series No Angels and The Chase.

Barden was 14 when she joined the cast of the ITV soap opera Coronation Street, playing Kayleigh Morton from March 2007 until the Morton family's departure from the soap in September 2008. Barden made her film debut in the 2007 comedy-drama Mrs Ratcliffe's Revolution. In 2009, she played Pea in the stage production Jerusalem at the Royal Court Theatre in London, which then transferred to the Apollo Theatre in the West End.

In 2010, Barden appeared in the film Tamara Drewe, a dramatisation of the comic strip of the same name, for which Barden was nominated for Young British Performer of the Year by the London Film Critics' Circle. The following year, she played Sophie in Joe Wright's Hanna. From 2012 to 2014, she had film roles in the horror Comedown, the mystery-drama In the Dark Half, the psychological thriller Mindscape, and the indie Lullaby.

Barden was named a 2015 Screen International Star of Tomorrow. That year, she played Kit Carmichael in the two-part adaptation of Sadie Jones' debut novel The Outcast on BBC One and Liddy in a film adaptation of Thomas Hardy's Far from the Madding Crowd. In 2016, Barden played the titular role of the Channel 4 television film Ellen as well as Jasmine in the comedy film Mindhorn and Justine in the third series of Penny Dreadful on Sky Atlantic. She starred in the 2017 horror film Habit.

Also in 2017, Barden began starring in the Channel 4 and Netflix dark comedy-drama The End of the F***ing World as Alyssa, a role she would play for both series. She starred in the 2018 films The New Romantic and Scarborough. For the latter, she was nominated for Best Supporting Actress at the British Independent Film Awards and National Film Awards UK. She won the IMDb Breakout Star Award and was named a 2018 BAFTA Breakthrough Brit.

Barden appeared in the 2019 music videos for Conan Gray's "Maniac" and Ozzy Osbourne's "Under the Graveyard", as well as the film Jungleland and the Australian Foxtel series Lambs of God. She had lead roles in the 2020 films Holler and Pink Skies Ahead.

In January 2021, it was announced Barden had been cast as Jane in the 2022 Netflix thriller Pieces of Her, an adaptation of Karin Slaughter's novel of the same name. She has upcoming roles in the ITV romantic comedy-drama You & Me and the football film An Unsuitable Game.

In a 2023 interview with The Daily Telegraph, Barden talked about her hatred of "working class tourism" in acting, calling out non-binary actor Emma Corrin, and committed to only playing roles that depict working class women from Yorkshire.

Personal life
Barden married Jungleland director Max Winkler in March 2021. On 19 October 2021, Barden announced she had given birth to their first child, a daughter.

Barden has opened up about her experiences with anxiety and therapy.

Filmography

Film

Television

Radio

Music videos

Stage

Awards and nominations

References

External links
 

1992 births
21st-century English actresses
Actresses from Yorkshire
English child actresses
English film actresses
English soap opera actresses
English television actresses
Living people
People from Northallerton
People from Wetherby